Congregation M'kor Shalom (meaning "Source of Peace") was a Reform Jewish synagogue located at 850 Evesham Road in Cherry Hill, New Jersey.

Founded in 1974, M'kor Shalom was affiliated with the Reform Movement.

History
Originally established at former locations in neighboring Marlton and Mount Laurel, the current building, which The New York Times described as "spectacular new gold brick and red-topped", opened in 1990 and is located on Evesham Road (CR 544) in an affluent area in Cherry Hill.  Its main hall has polished wood, and stained glass windows created by Paul Friend.  The synagogue is built on the site of the Butts House, built in the 18th century near the boundary of the township with Evesham Township and believed to have been first owned by the Matlack family.

In 1990, an Atlantic County grand jury indicted a man from Brooklyn on charges relating to his alleged theft of Torahs from the synagogue.  That year the financially troubled Congregation Beth Jacob-Beth Israel in Cherry Hill loaned the synagogue torahs, went bankrupt, was purchased by Congregation M'kor Shalom, and planned to transfer all of its assets to it.

Rabbi Fred Neulander founded the synagogue with a few supporters from the Reform synagogue Temple Emanuel, and served until his resignation in 1995.  He became publicly known after he was convicted of paying congregant Len Jenoff and drifter Paul Daniels $18,000 to murder his wife Carol on November 1, 1994. Her memorial service was attended by almost 1,000 people at the synagogue.

In 1997, 100 people were evacuated from the synagogue when a bomb threat was called in.  No bomb was found.  In 2000, the synagogue marked its 10th year of preparing casseroles for Ronald McDonald House and soup kitchens, as a mitzvah.  That year, the synagogue also joined Temple Emanuel in Cherry Hill and Congregation Adath Emanu-El in Mount Laurel as well as the Jewish Federation of Southern New Jersey to raise money to build "Shalom House" in Camden.  Also in 2000, congregants planted a  meditation and tzedakah garden from which food was to be donated to food banks and soup kitchens.

In 2022, M'kor Shalom and Temple Emanuel merged into one synagogue called Congregation Kol Ami, located at Temple Emanuel's building. The M'kor Shalom building is expected to become a Yeshiva for Jewish boys.

Leadership
Prior to closing, the clergy included Rabbi Jennifer Frenkel, Cantor Rhoda Harrison, Ph.D., and Cantor Anita F. Hochman.  Marlene Dworkin served as the Congregation President and Michelle Bross was the Executive Director.

Rabbi Gary Mazo is a former rabbi of the synagogue, who began there as an assistant rabbi in 1990.  Barry Schwartz was senior rabbi of the synagogue, before leaving to become the new CEO of the Jewish Publication Society in 2010. Rabbi Richard F. Address, D.Min. is the immediate former senior rabbi at M'kor Shalom.

Prayer book and programs
The prayer book used during services is Mishkan T'filah. M'kor Shalom offers a religious school program for grades pre-K through 12, a full-time Early Childhood Center for ages 2 through Kindergarten, as well as adult education programs.

References

External links

Buildings and structures in Camden County, New Jersey
Cherry Hill, New Jersey
Reform synagogues in New Jersey
Jewish organizations established in 1974
1974 establishments in New Jersey